Ballydivity is a townland of 333 acres in County Antrim, Northern Ireland. It is situated in the civil parish of Derrykeighan and historic barony of Dunluce Lower.

Places of interest
Ballydivity House, near Ballymoney is a two-storey three-bay house of c.1760. It was added to from c.1810 and a central staircase and drawing room extended in 1911.  The demesne features mature shelter belt trees, two walled gardens and a gardener's house. It is not open to the public.

See also 
List of townlands in County Antrim

References

Townlands of County Antrim
Civil parish of Derrykeighan